Yuripopovinidae is an extinct family of Coreoidea Hemipteran true bugs. Member species are known from the Early Cretaceous and early Late Cretaceous of Asia and northern Gondwana. Among the distinguishing characters are "the hemelytral costal vein apically much thickened and pterostigma-like, the corium with two large cells separated by one longitudinal straight vein." Dehiscensicoridae, described from the Yixian Formation of China has been deemed a junior synonym of Yuripopovinidae per Du et al. (2019). The family was named after Russian paleoentomologist Yuri Alexandrovich Popov.

Genera 
 †Caulisoculus  Burmese amber, Myanmar, Cenomanian
 †Changirostrus  Yixian Formation, China, Aptian
 †Crassiantenninus  Yixian Formation, China, Aptian
 †Dehiscensicoris  Yixian Formation, China, Aptian
 †Minuticoris  Yixian Formation, China, Aptian
 †Megaoptocoris  Burmese amber, Myanmar, Cenomanian
 †Pingquanicoris  Yixian Formation, China, Aptian
†Pseusocaulisoculus  Burmese amber, Myanmar, Cenomanian
 †Reticulatitergum  Burmese amber, Myanmar, Cenomanian
 †Yuripopovina  Lebanese amber, Barremian

References

Coreoidea
Prehistoric insect families